Angelo Buccarello, OSST (born 12 May 1942) is an Italian Catholic priest and member of the Trinitarians known for his founding of the Catholic Chaplaincy for Prisons.

Biography

Buccarello was born in Castrignano del Capo, a small Town in Southern Italy, on 12 May 1942.

After primary and junior secondary school, he entered the Trinitarian Order (OSST) on 17 November 1955. He entered the noviciate in 1959 and then pursued his studies: senior secondary school in Livorno, Italy, philosophy at the College of St. Crisogonus in Rome, and theology at the Pontifical Urbaniana University in Rome.

He was ordained to the priesthood on 28 June 1968. On 11 October 1969, he was assigned to a mission in Madagascar.

His missionary work consisted mostly in welcoming people, helping them, evangelizing them, educating them in the faith, often by touring and visiting the fifty or so Christian communities in the country.

In 1981, he was called to Antananarivo to train the young Trinitarian brothers of Madagascar. In 1983, the Cardinal named him Chaplain of the prisons of Antananarivo.

Work
He was named Catholic Chaplain for the Prisons of Madagascar. As a result, he founded the social programme of the ACP (Catholic Chaplaincy for Prisons). The ACP, whose centre is called Tonga Soa, has performed a service to detainees and their families.
The ACP is at present recognized by the Malagasy State as an ONG, of which Fr. Angelo is the founding president.

He has worked in the prison domain with the ACP until his departure from Madagascar in 2001.

With the ACP, his aim was to help his brother prisoners, especially the poorest, in their vital and legal needs, as well as in helping them regain their dignity, their goodness, their vocation.

The ACP team provides:

 Food services
 Medical aid
 Social assistance
 Legal aid
 Rehabilitation for freed prisoners
 Production of coal from refuse.

He opened centres for children of detainees in Amboditsiry, Andranobevava, Analamahitsy, Fenomanana, Anjiro, as well as for the most undernourished detainees of Androndra.

After 32 years in Madagascar, of which 20 in Antananarivo, he was elected and named general Counsellor of the Trinitarian Order, in July 2001, in Rome (Italy).

He was later named President of the Trinitarian International Solidarity, an organism with the aim of liberation.

Decorations
In December 1996, Fr. Angelo received the prize for Human Rights from the French President, Jacques Chirac.

He was named member of the Commission Nationale Malgache for Human Rights, and was decorated Knight and Officer of the Ordre National Malgache.

His great exploit: Madagascar was the only country in the world which, on the occasion of the Jubilee Year 2000, year of reconciliation and of debt remission, freed some 3000 prisoners, as a gesture of clemency, thanks to the faith and tenacity of Fr. Angelo and of the group Rêve 2000  which he had formed, as well as the good response of the Bishops and of the Government.

References

20th-century Italian Roman Catholic priests
1942 births
Living people
People from the Province of Lecce
Pontifical Urban University alumni
Trinitarians
Italian expatriates in Madagascar